Stéfano Souza Pinho (born 12 January 1991) is a Brazilian professional footballer who plays as a forward for Paysandu Sports Club in the Campeonato Brasileiro Série C.

Club career
Pinho was top scorer at the 2013 MLS Combine. He was drafted in round two of the 2013 MLS Supplemental Draft by Colorado Rapids but was not signed by the club.

In 2014, Pinho joined MyPa of the Finnish top flight on loan from Fluminense FC.

On 17 March 2015, Fort Lauderdale Strikers of the North American Soccer League announced that Pinho had joined the club for the 2015 season on loan from Fluminense FC, along with teammate Marlon Freitas and Corinthians defender PC. During the 2015 season, Pinho helped Fort Lauderdale reach the NASL Championship semi finals and won the NASL Golden Ball award for being the league MVP and Golden Boot as top scorer.

On 3 December 2015, it was announced that Pinho signed with Minnesota United FC for the 2016 NASL season.

In 2017 Pinho spent a third successive season in NASL, again with a different team. This time he guided Miami FC to a Spring season and Fall season championship double and once again collected the NASL Golden Ball and Golden Boot awards.

Pinho signed with Orlando City SC of MLS on 18 December 2017. He made his debut as a substitute at home to D.C. United in the season opener on 3 March 2018 and scored a stoppage time equalizer. After one season with the club, Pinho was waived by Orlando on 16 January 2019.

On 22 January 2019, he signed with Thai League 1 side PT Prachuap. On 1 March 2019, Pinho transferred to the China League One side Xinjiang Tianshan Leopard.

On 26 February 2021, Pinho joined USL Championship side Austin Bold FC.

Pinho moved to USL Championship side Indy Eleven on 31 January 2022.

Career statistics

Club

Personal
Pinho holds a U.S. green card which qualifies him as a domestic player for MLS roster purposes.

Honours

Individual
NASL MVP (2) : 2015, 2017
NASL Golden Boot (2): 2015, 2017

References

External links
 

1991 births
Living people
Brazilian footballers
Association football forwards
Brazilian expatriate footballers
Brazilian expatriate sportspeople in the United States
Expatriate footballers in Finland
Expatriate soccer players in the United States
Fluminense FC players
Guaratinguetá Futebol players
Indy Eleven players
Madureira Esporte Clube players
Myllykosken Pallo −47 players
Fort Lauderdale Strikers players
Minnesota United FC (2010–2016) players
Miami FC players
Orlando City SC players
Colorado Rapids draft picks
Veikkausliiga players
North American Soccer League players
Major League Soccer players
Xinjiang Tianshan Leopard F.C. players
China League One players
Al-Washm Club players
Saudi Second Division players
Austin Bold FC players
Expatriate footballers in China
Expatriate footballers in Saudi Arabia
Brazilian expatriate sportspeople in China
Brazilian expatriate sportspeople in Saudi Arabia